Leo Francis Clarke (11 February 1930 – 18 June 2007) was an Australian rules footballer who played with Richmond in the Victorian Football League (VFL).

Notes

External links 

1930 births
2007 deaths
Australian rules footballers from Victoria (Australia)
Richmond Football Club players